Chaintri is a village in Beer, Haripur district in northeastern Pakistan. It lies to the northwest of Lakhala and to the northeast of Dairi. Chaintri is said to be noted for its white joria wool.

References

External links
Maplandia World Gazetteer

Populated places in Abbottabad District